Lukas Brazdauskis (born October 1, 1988) is a Lithuanian professional basketball player.

References
  Player information. Lietuvos Rytas.
  Player information. LKL (Lithuanian Basketball League).

1988 births
Living people
BC Dzūkija players
BC Nevėžis players
BC Pieno žvaigždės players
BC Rytas players
Lithuanian men's basketball players
Small forwards